Piazzola sul Brenta is a comune (municipality) in the Province of Padua in the Italian region Veneto, located about  west of Venice and about  northwest of Padua.

Main sights
Villa Contarini, begun by Andrea Palladio
Villa Paccagnella, also attributed to Palladio
Tempietto of San Benigno.

References

External links
 Official website 

Cities and towns in Veneto